Horacio Terra Arocena (1894–1985) was a Uruguayan architect and political figure.

Background

From a prominent political family, his uncle Gabriel Terra was President of Uruguay 1931–1938; his son Juan Pablo Terra served as a Deputy and a Senator.

He was an architect by profession.

Political office
Horacio Terra Arocena served for years as a Senator. He was allied with Christian Democrats.

He was candidate to the National Council of Government in 1958 and 1962.

Death
He died in 1985.

Honors
 Knight of St. Gregory the Great

See also

 Politics of Uruguay
 List of political families#Uruguay

References

Candidates for President of Uruguay
1894 births
1985 deaths
Christian Democratic Party of Uruguay politicians
Members of the Senate of Uruguay
Uruguayan architects
Knights of St. Gregory the Great